Marit Bratberg Lund (born 7 November 1997) is a Norwegian footballer who plays for Toppserien club Brann.

She hails from Ilseng and started her senior career in FL Fart. In mid-2014 she moved on to Kolbotn IL, and ahead of the 2021 season to IL Sandviken. She was also a prolific Norway youth international.

Sandviken whom she joined in 2021, led the league and eventually became league champions. Several football experts and pundits suggested that she be called up to the full national team, and expressed a failure to understand why no call-up came in 2021. Lund was called the best left-footed footballer in Norway. She was however named as Player of the Year in 2021 Toppserien, ranking highest on the score table of the Norwegian News Agency, praising her attacking capabilities with 7 league goals and 14 assists.

References

1997 births
Living people
People from Stange
Sportspeople from Innlandet
Norwegian women's footballers
Norway women's youth international footballers
Norway women's international footballers
FL Fart players
Kolbotn Fotball players
SK Brann Kvinner players
Toppserien players
Women's association football defenders